The New Hampshire Wildcats represent the University of New Hampshire in Women's Hockey East Association play during the 2017–18 NCAA Division I women's ice hockey season.

Offseason

Recruiting

Standings

Roster

2017–18 Wildcats

2017–18 schedule

|-
!colspan=12 style="background:#27408B;color:#FFFFFF;"| WHEA Tournament

References

New Hampshire
New Hampshire Wildcats women's ice hockey seasons
New Ham
New Ham